The Seattle Mist were a team in the Legends Football League that were founded as part of the Lingerie Bowl's expansion into a full-fledged league in 2009. They played their home games at the ShoWare Center in Kent, Washington. The league, originally named the Lingerie Football League, rebranded in 2013 and shifted away from Super Bowl halftime shows. The Mist won three championships, known as the Legends Cup.

Following the 2019 season, the LFL ceased operations and relaunched as the Extreme Football League (X League), which first played in 2022. All former LFL teams received new brands and the Mist were replaced by the Seattle Thunder.

History
In 2004, the first Lingerie Bowl was played during halftime of Super Bowl XXXVIII between two teams of models and actresses wearing lingerie and minimal protective football gear. The Lingerie Bowl was played for three consecutive years as an alternative Super Bowl halftime event while adding additional teams in 2005 and 2006. The event was then cancelled for various reasons in 2007, 2008, and 2009. In 2009, the event organizers launched the concept as a full league called the Lingerie Football League (LFL), culminating in the Lingerie Bowl as the championship game between the conference champions, still during the Super Bowl halftime.

The league launched its inaugural 2009–10 season with ten teams in two conferences with the Seattle Mist in the Western Conference. Each LFL team played the other four teams in its division once. Two of the games were at home and two were on the road. The Mist went 3–1 in its first season, but failed to make it to the playoffs as per the league's tie-breaking procedures.

The 2010–11 LFL season had the same schedule format as the 2009–10 season, but all games aired on MTV2. The Mist went 0–3 in the season and the last game against the Dallas Desire was cancelled due to the potential of inclement weather in the outdoor stadium and neither team winning a game. The following season, the Mist signed Angela Rypien, the daughter of former Washington Redskins' quarterback Mark Rypien, as their starting quarterback. She debuted against the Green Bay Chill on September 30, 2011. The team went 2–2 and missed the playoffs for the third straight season.

The league postponed the 2012–13 season, but the Mist played a game called the Pacific Cup against LFL Canada's BC Angels at the ShoWare Center on December 15, 2012. In January 2013, the LFL rebranded as the Legends Football League, shifted away from the Super Bowl halftime event, and moved the season to a spring and summer schedule starting in March 2013. The Mist qualified for the playoffs for the first time in the 2013 season after an undefeated regular season, but lost to the Chicago Bliss in the conference championship game. The team then missed the playoffs in 2014 after losing to the Los Angeles Temptation in their last game of the season.

In 2015, the team made it back to the playoffs and won their first Legends Cup over the Chicago Bliss 27–21. They lost to the Bliss in the Legends Cup the following season, but went on to win again in 2017 and 2019.

After the 2019 season, the LFL effectively ceased operations and restructured as the X League, replacing the Mist with the Seattle Thunder identity.

Seasons

2009–10

Roster

1 Michele Selover TE
2 Jenna Lynn Bloczynski LB-TE
3 Natalya Snetkova RB
4 Bruna Araujo WR
5 Harper Boiz S
6 Caya Ukkas CB
7 Alicia McLauchlin QB
8 Chelsie Jorensen OL
9 Maggie Pearson C
10 Katie Sheaffer RB
11 Candice Gardiner CB
11 Myschon Bales
12 Shannon Sypher WR

Training Camp gallery

2010–11

Roster

1 Kiara Williams
2 Stevi Schnoor
3 Dominique Maloy
4 Katie Whelan
5 Alli Alberts
6 Kristine Cortez
7 Emily Schneider
8 Alanna Vann
9 Kera Bryant
10 Savannah Wood
11 Stacey Jackman
12 Vonetta Gooden
13 Amber Camp
14 Shea Norton
15 KK Matheny
16 Kenia Diggit
18 Jade Randle
19 Denise Simens
20 Ja'Melia Adams

2011–12 season

Roster

1 Laurel Creel QB-DB
2 Ericka Smith WR-DB
3 Natalie Suhey OL-DL
4 Riki Creger-Zier WR-DB
5 Jessica Hopkins WR-S
6 Kerry Warren OL-LB
7 Kam Warner RB-LB
9 Cristina Fetzer CB-C
10 Lashaunda Fowler OL-DL
11 Angela Rypien QB-S
12 Christine Moore C-DL
13 Emily Bell CB-RB
14 Melissa Bernasconi WR-S
15 Shea Norton OL-DL

2013 season

Roster

1 Laurel Creel QB-DB
2 Mele Rich WR-DB
3 Natalie Suhey OL-DL 
4 Riki Creger-Zier WR-DB
5 Jessica Hopkins WR-S
6 Kerry Warren OL-LB
7 Shuree Hyatt C-DE  
9 Cristina Fetzer CB-C 
10 Lashaunda Fowler OL-DL 
11 Stormy Keffeler QB-S
12 Christine Moore C-DL
13 Emily Bell CB-RB
14 Melissa Bernasconi WR-S
15 Shea Norton OL-DL

2014 season

Roster

2 Stevi Schnoor RB-DE
3 Rachel Corey WR-DB
4 Maria Bottenberg WR-DB
5 Jessica Hopkins WR-S
6 Melanie Ohlenkamp WR-DB
7 Lily Granston SS
8 Erica Legaspi WR-S
9 Kasey Carter TE-LB
10 Lashaunda Fowler WR-DE
11 Angela Rypien QB
12 Maryanne Hanson QB
13 Stormy Keffeler C-DE
14 Veronica Velludo QB-S
15 Rebecca Velludo WR-DB
17 Megan Hanson C-DE
18 Ashlye Parker TE-DE
20 Deanna Schaper-Kotter DE

2015 season

Roster

0 Jena Weiss C
1 Kadi Findling CB-QB
2 Stevi Schnoor RB-DE
3 Jessika Howard WR-DB
4 Katie Whelan DE-TE
5 Jessica Hopkins S-WR
6 Theresa Petruziello WR-SS
7 Lily Granston SS-RB
8 Danika Brace LB-TE
9 Chloe Treleven WR-DB
10 Lashaunda Fowler WR-CB
12 Emily Woods WR-DB
13 Kasey Carter C-DE
14 Mele Gilmore RB-CB
15 KK Matheny QB
17 Megan Hanson C-DE-CB
18 Erica Legaspi RB-DB
19 Bryn Renda WR-S
20 Deanna Schaper-Kotter DE

2016 season

2017 season

2018 season

2019 season

References

External links
 

Legends Football League US teams
American football in Seattle
American football teams established in 2009
American football teams in Washington (state)
2009 establishments in Washington (state)
Women's sports in Washington (state)